Amin Police Academy is a police academy in Iran affiliated with the Law Enforcement Command of Islamic Republic of Iran. The academy has provided training courses for police forces from 16 countries and is headed by General Lotfali Bakhtiari.

References

External links 
  Amin Police University

Iran
Universities in Iran
Law Enforcement Command of Islamic Republic of Iran